Cameraria arcuella is a moth of the family Gracillariidae. It is known from Ontario and Québec in Canada and Virginia and Maine in the United States.

The wingspan is about 10 mm.

The larvae may feed on Quercus species. They probably mine the leaves of their host plant.

References

Cameraria (moth)
Moths of North America
Lepidoptera of Canada
Moths described in 1908
Taxa named by Annette Frances Braun
Lepidoptera of the United States